An evil corporation is a trope in popular culture that portrays a corporation as ignoring social responsibility, morality, ethics, and sometimes laws in order to make profit for its shareholders. In rare cases, the corporation may be well intentioned but extremist, engaging in noble cause corruption.

In fiction
The notion is "deeply embedded in the landscape of contemporary culture—populating films, novels, videogames, and more." The science fiction genre served as the initial background to portray corporations in this dystopian light. 

Evil corporations can be seen to represent the danger of combining capitalism with larger hubris.

In real life
In real life some corporations have been accused of being evil. To guard against such accusations, Google at one point in its history had the official motto "Don't be evil", however they abandoned that motto for being too obviously frivolous. The New Yorker wrote that "many food activists consider Monsanto (which later merged with Bayer) to be the definitively evil corporation". 

The Debate over Corporate Social Responsibility wrote, "For many consumers, Wal-Mart serves as the evil corporation prototype, but record numbers shop at the stores for low prices." 

In Japan, a committee of journalists and rights activists issues an annual "corporate raspberry award" known as Most Evil Corporation of the Year Award (also called the Black Company Award) to a company "with a culture of overwork, discrimination and harassment".

See also

 Anti-capitalism
 Anti-consumerism
 Anti-corporate activism
 Big Pharma conspiracy theory
 Business ethics
 Corporate crime
 Corporate warfare
 Criticism of capitalism
 Criticisms of corporations
 Cyberpunk
 Ethically disputed business practices (category)
 
 Karen Silkwood
 List of corporate collapses and scandals
 Megacorporation
 Military–industrial complex
 Multinational corporation
 Organized crime
 Prison–industrial complex
 Psychopathy in the workplace
 Shareholder primacy
 State crime
 State-corporate crime
 The Corporation (2003 film)

References

Further reading

External links
Sample list of evil corporations in film at MTV
Sample list of evil corporations in science fiction at PC World
Sample list of evil corporations in science fiction books at Barnes & Noble

Science fiction themes
Cyberpunk themes
 
Anti-corporate activism
Tropes
Fiction about organizations
Dystopian fiction
Corruption
Corporate conduct